The James H B Carr Stakes is an Australian Turf Club Group 3 Thoroughbred  horse race under set weights with penalties conditions for three-year-old fillies, held over a distance of 1400 metres at Randwick Racecourse, Sydney, Australia in April. Prizemoney is A$160,000.

History

Grade
 1986–2013 - Listed race
 2014 onwards - Group 3

Winners

 2022 - Espiona
 2021 - All Hallows' Eve 
 2020 - Rubisaki 
 2019 - Laburnum 
 2018 - Moss Trip 
 2017 - Raiment 
 2016 - Yattarna
 2015 - Slightly Sweet
 2014 - Estonian Princess    
 2013 - Missy Cummings  
 2012 - Angel Of Mercy  
 2011 - Red Tracer  
 2010 - Happy Hippy   
 2009 - Silently  
 2008 - Nediyms Dream  
 2007 - Stellamac   
 2006 - Pasikatera    
 2005 - Happier    
 2004 - Royal Mask  
 2003 - Private Steer    
 2002 - Trail Of Gold 
 2001 - Secret Liaisons  
 2000 - Poppett    
 1999 - Wynciti    
 1998 - Flickering Fire    
 1997 - Prairie    
 1996 - Seika    
 1995 - Georgia Belle    
 1994 - Hot To Race    
 1993 - Flitter    
 1992 - Ride The Rapids    
 1991 - Quiet Queen    
 1990 - Miss Uvana   
 1989 - Galspray   
 1988 - Lanyard    
 1987 - †Fiorit / Rainbow High   
 1986 - Signal To Noise    

† Dead heat

See also
 List of Australian Group races
 Group races

References

External links 
First three placegetters James H B Carr Stakes (ATC)

Horse races in Australia
Randwick Racecourse